Drumadonald railway station was on the Great Northern Railway (Ireland) which ran from Banbridge to Castlewellan in Northern Ireland.

History

The station was opened on 2 October 1932.

The station closed on 2 May 1955.

References 

Disused railway stations in County Down
Railway stations opened in 1932
Railway stations closed in 1955
1932 establishments in Northern Ireland
1955 disestablishments in Northern Ireland
Railway stations in Northern Ireland opened in the 20th century